The Lancair Barracuda is an American amateur-built aircraft produced by Lancair of Uvalde, Texas. It was introduced at AirVenture in July 2018. The aircraft is supplied as a kit for amateur construction.

The design is a development of the Lancair Legacy, employing a one-piece wing with greater span.

Design and development
The Barracuda was designed to provide more speed, with simplified kit construction over earlier models.

The aircraft features a cantilever low-wing, a two-seats-in-side-by-side configuration enclosed cockpit under a bubble canopy, partially or optionally fully retractable tricycle landing gear and a single engine in tractor configuration.

The aircraft is made from composite material, including e-glass, carbon fiber with a  Nomex honeycomb core. Its  span wing has a double taper planform and mounts Fowler flaps. The standard engine used is the  Lycoming IO-390, with the  Continental IO-550-N powerplant optional.

The kit includes the airframe, engine, propeller and the avionics, usually the Garmin G3X Touch glass cockpit flight display and GTN-750 GPS, airband VHF radio, multifunction display.

The kit purchase price includes Lancair's basic two-week Builder Assistance program.

Operational history
The first customer-completed Barracuda was displayed at Sun 'n Fun, in April 2019.

Specifications (Barracuda)

References

External links

Lancair aircraft
2010s United States sport aircraft
Single-engined tractor aircraft
Low-wing aircraft
Homebuilt aircraft
Aircraft first flown in 2018